Damien Marie (born 19 June 1994) is a French footballer who last played for Levski Lom as a winger.

References

External links
 FK Senica official club profile
 Futbalnet profile
 

1994 births
Living people
French footballers
French expatriate footballers
Association football midfielders
FC Saint-Lô Manche players
FK Inter Bratislava players
FC Tsarsko Selo Sofia players
FK Senica players
FK Slavoj Trebišov players
Championnat National 3 players
First Professional Football League (Bulgaria) players
Slovak Super Liga players
2. Liga (Slovakia) players
Expatriate footballers in Slovakia
Expatriate footballers in Bulgaria
French expatriate sportspeople in Slovakia
French expatriate sportspeople in Bulgaria